Frank Hördler (born 26 January 1985) is a German professional ice hockey defenceman who currently plays for the Eisbären Berlin in the Deutsche Eishockey Liga.

His elder brother David Hördler was also a hockey player  and his son Eric also plays alongside him with Eisbären Berlin.

Career statistics

Regular season and playoffs

International

Awards and honors

References

External links
 

1985 births
Living people
Eisbären Berlin players
German ice hockey defencemen
People from Bad Muskau
Ice hockey players at the 2018 Winter Olympics
Medalists at the 2018 Winter Olympics
Olympic ice hockey players of Germany
Olympic medalists in ice hockey
Olympic silver medalists for Germany
Sportspeople from Saxony